Anthidium larocai is a species of bee in the family Megachilidae, the leaf-cutter, carder, or mason bees.

Distribution
Brazil

References

larocai
Insects described in 1997